Marguerite Dilhan (1876–1956) was the first French lawyer to have pleaded in the sitting court on 26 November 1903. She was sworn in July 1903, at the age of 27, thanks to the law of 1 December 1900 allowing women to take the oath of attorney after Olga Balachowski-Petit and Jeanne Chauvin. She continued her career as a lawyer by opening a law firm in Toulouse, she was also integrated in  several associations including the Goutte de lait, a Toulouse association fighting against infant mortality.

References

1876 births
1956 deaths
20th-century French women lawyers
20th-century French lawyers